Christine White (born 16 November 1952 in Melbourne, Victoria) is a former Australian cricket player. White played one test and six one day internationals for the Australia national women's cricket team.

Along with Anne Gordon, Margaret Jennings, Elaine Bray, Sharyn Fitzsimmons, Lorraine Hill, Janette and Sharon Tredrea, White was a member of the Victorian state women's cricket team that contested the 1976 Australian women's cricket championship.

References

External links
 Christine White at CricketArchive
 Christine White at southernstars.org.au

1952 births
Australia women One Day International cricketers
Australia women Test cricketers
Living people
Victoria women cricketers